A Kiss in Time is a 1921 American silent comedy film directed by Thomas N. Heffron and written by Douglas Z. Doty. The film stars Wanda Hawley, T. Roy Barnes, Bertram Johns, Walter Hiers, and Margaret Loomis. The film was released in July 1921, by Realart Pictures Corporation.

Cast   
Wanda Hawley as Sheila Ashlone
T. Roy Barnes as Brian Moore
Bertram Johns as Robert Codman Ames
Walter Hiers as Bertie Ballast
Margaret Loomis as Nymph

References

External links

1921 films
1920s English-language films
Silent American comedy films
1921 comedy films
Films directed by Thomas N. Heffron
American silent feature films
American black-and-white films
1920s American films